Marko Palavestrić (Serbian Cyrillic: Марко Палавестрић; born August 12, 1982) is a retired Serbian footballer.

He had previously played in FK Jedinstvo Ub and OFK Mladenovac as loaned Red Star Belgrade, but also in Bulgarian FC Spartak Varna and Romanian FC Brașov.

External links
 Profile at Srbijafudbal
 Profile at FootballDatabase

1982 births
Living people
Footballers from Belgrade
Serbian footballers
Serbian expatriate footballers
FK Jedinstvo Ub players
OFK Mladenovac players
PFC Spartak Varna players
First Professional Football League (Bulgaria) players
Association football defenders
Serbian expatriate sportspeople in Bulgaria
Expatriate footballers in Bulgaria